Acetaldehyde (IUPAC systematic name ethanal) is an organic chemical compound with the formula CH3CHO, sometimes abbreviated by chemists as MeCHO (Me = methyl). It is a colorless liquid or gas, boiling near room temperature. It is one of the most important aldehydes, occurring widely in nature and being produced on a large scale in industry. Acetaldehyde occurs naturally in coffee, bread, and ripe fruit, and is produced by plants. It is also produced by the partial oxidation of ethanol by the liver enzyme alcohol dehydrogenase and is a contributing cause of hangover after alcohol consumption. Pathways of exposure include air, water, land, or groundwater, as well as drink and smoke. Consumption of disulfiram inhibits acetaldehyde dehydrogenase, the enzyme responsible for the metabolism of acetaldehyde, thereby causing it to build up in the body.

The International Agency for Research on Cancer (IARC) has listed acetaldehyde as a Group 1 carcinogen. Acetaldehyde is "one of the most frequently found air toxins with cancer risk greater than one in a million".

History
Acetaldehyde was first observed by the Swedish pharmacist/chemist Carl Wilhelm Scheele (1774); it was then investigated by the French chemists Antoine François, comte de Fourcroy and Louis Nicolas Vauquelin (1800), and the German chemists Johann Wolfgang Döbereiner (1821, 1822, 1832) and Justus von Liebig (1835). In 1835, Liebig named it "aldehyde"; the name was later altered to "acetaldehyde".

Production
In 2003, global production was about 1 million tonnes.  Before 1962, ethanol and acetylene were the major sources of acetaldehyde. Since then, ethylene is the dominant feedstock.

The main method of production is the oxidation of ethylene by the Wacker process, which involves oxidation of ethylene using a homogeneous palladium/copper system:
2 CH2=CH2  +  O2  -> 2 CH3CHO
In the 1970s, the world capacity of the Wacker-Hoechst direct oxidation process exceeded 2 million tonnes annually.

Smaller quantities can be prepared by the partial oxidation of ethanol in an exothermic reaction.  This process typically is conducted over a silver catalyst at about 500–650 °C.
 CH3CH2OH  +  1/2 O2   ->   CH3CHO  +  H2O
This method is one of the oldest routes for the industrial preparation of acetaldehyde.

Other methods

Hydration of acetylene
Prior to the Wacker process and the availability of cheap ethylene, acetaldehyde was produced by the hydration of acetylene. This reaction is catalyzed by mercury(II) salts:
C2H2  +  Hg^2+  +  H2O   ->   CH3CHO  +  Hg
The mechanism involves the intermediacy of vinyl alcohol, which tautomerizes to acetaldehyde. The reaction is conducted at 90–95 °C, and the acetaldehyde formed is separated from water and mercury and cooled to 25–30 °C. In the wet oxidation process, iron(III) sulfate is used to reoxidize the mercury back to the mercury(II) salt. The resulting iron(II) sulfate is oxidized in a separate reactor with nitric acid.

Dehydrogenation of ethanol
Traditionally, acetaldehyde was produced by the partial dehydrogenation of ethanol:
 CH3CH2OH   ->  CH3CHO  +  H2
In this endothermic process, ethanol vapor is passed at 260–290 °C over a copper-based catalyst.  The process was once attractive because of the value of the hydrogen coproduct, but in modern times is not economically viable.

Hydroformylation of methanol
The hydroformylation of methanol with catalysts like cobalt, nickel, or iron salts also produces acetaldehyde, although this process is of no industrial importance.  Similarly noncompetitive, acetaldehyde arises from synthesis gas with modest selectivity.

Reactions

Tautomerization of acetaldehyde to vinyl alcohol

Like many other carbonyl compounds, acetaldehyde tautomerizes to give an enol (vinyl alcohol; IUPAC name: ethenol):

CH3CH=O  ⇌  CH2=CHOH             ∆H298,g = +42.7 kJ/mol

The equilibrium constant is 6 at room temperature, thus that the relative amount of the enol form in a sample of acetaldehyde is very small. At room temperature, acetaldehyde (CH3CH=O) is more stable than vinyl alcohol (CH2=CHOH) by 42.7 kJ/mol: Overall the keto-enol tautomerization occurs slowly but is catalyzed by acids.

Photo-induced keto-enol tautomerization is viable under atmospheric or stratospheric conditions.  This photo-tautomerization is relevant to the earth's atmosphere, because vinyl alcohol is thought to be a precursor to carboxylic acids in the atmosphere.

Condensation reactions
Acetaldehyde is a common electrophile in organic synthesis. In condensation reactions, acetaldehyde is prochiral. It is used primarily as a source of the "CH3C+H(OH)" synthon in aldol and related condensation reactions. Grignard reagents and organolithium compounds react with MeCHO to give hydroxyethyl derivatives. In one of the more spectacular condensation reactions, three equivalents of formaldehyde add to MeCHO to give pentaerythritol, C(CH2OH)4.

In a Strecker reaction, acetaldehyde condenses with cyanide and ammonia to give, after hydrolysis, the amino acid alanine. Acetaldehyde can condense with amines to yield imines; for example, with cyclohexylamine to give N-ethylidenecyclohexylamine. These imines can be used to direct subsequent reactions like an aldol condensation.

It is also a building block in the synthesis of heterocyclic compounds. In one example, it converts, upon treatment with ammonia, to 5-ethyl-2-methylpyridine ("aldehyde-collidine").

Polymeric forms

Three molecules of acetaldehyde condense to form "paraldehyde", a cyclic trimer containing C-O single bonds. Similarly condensation of four molecules of acetaldehyde give the cyclic molecule metaldehyde.  Paraldehyde can be produced in good yields, using a sulfuric acid catalyst.  Metaldehyde is only obtained in a few percent yield and with cooling, often using HBr rather than H2SO4 as the catalyst.  At -40 °C in the presence of acid catalysts, polyacetaldehyde is produced. There are two stereomers of paraldehyde and four of metaldehyde.

The German chemist Valentin Hermann Weidenbusch (1821–1893) synthesized paraldehyde in 1848 by treating acetaldehyde with acid (either sulfuric or nitric acid) and cooling to 0°C. He found it quite remarkable that when paraldehyde was heated with a trace of the same acid, the reaction went the other way, recreating acetaldehyde.

Acetal derivatives

Acetaldehyde forms a stable acetal upon reaction with ethanol under conditions that favor dehydration. The product, CH3CH(OCH2CH3)2, is formally named 1,1-diethoxyethane but is commonly referred to as "acetal". This can cause confusion as "acetal" is more commonly used to describe compounds with the functional groups RCH(OR')2 or RR'C(OR'')2 rather than referring to this specific compound – in fact, 1,1-diethoxyethane is also described as the diethyl acetal of acetaldehyde.

Precursor to vinylphosphonic acid
Acetaldehyde is a precursor to vinylphosphonic acid, which is used to make adhesives and ion conductive membranes.  The synthesis sequence begins with a reaction with phosphorus trichloride:
PCl3  +  CH3CHO   →   CH3CH(O−)PCl3+
 CH3CH(O−)PCl3+  +  2 CH3CO2H   →   CH3CH(Cl)PO(OH)2  +  2 CH3COCl
CH3CH(Cl)PO(OH)2   →   CH2=CHPO(OH)2  +  HCl

Biochemistry
In the liver, the enzyme alcohol dehydrogenase oxidizes ethanol into acetaldehyde, which is then further oxidized into harmless acetic acid by acetaldehyde dehydrogenase. These two oxidation reactions are coupled with the reduction of NAD+ to NADH. In the brain, the enzyme catalase is primarily responsible for oxidizing ethanol to acetaldehyde, and alcohol dehydrogenase plays a minor role. The last steps of alcoholic fermentation in bacteria, plants, and yeast involve the conversion of pyruvate into acetaldehyde and carbon dioxide by the enzyme pyruvate decarboxylase, followed by the conversion of acetaldehyde into ethanol. The latter reaction is again catalyzed by an alcohol dehydrogenase, now operating in the opposite direction.

Uses
Traditionally, acetaldehyde was mainly used as a precursor to acetic acid.  This application has declined because acetic acid is produced more efficiently from methanol by the Monsanto and Cativa processes. Acetaldehyde is an important precursor to pyridine derivatives, pentaerythritol, and crotonaldehyde.  Urea and acetaldehyde combine to give a useful resin.  Acetic anhydride reacts with acetaldehyde to give ethylidene diacetate, a precursor to vinyl acetate, which is used to produce polyvinyl acetate.

The global market for acetaldehyde is declining. Demand has been impacted by changes in the production of plasticizer alcohols, which has shifted because n-butyraldehyde is less often produced from acetaldehyde, instead being generated by hydroformylation of propylene.  Likewise, acetic acid, once produced from acetaldehyde, is made predominantly by the lower-cost methanol carbonylation process. The impact on demand has led to increase in prices and thus slowdown in the market.

Consumption of acetaldehyde (103 t) in 2003(* Included in others -glyoxal/glyoxalic acid, crotonaldehyde, lactic acid, n-butanol, 2-ethylhexanol)

China is the largest consumer of acetaldehyde in the world, accounting for almost half of global consumption in 2012. Major use has been the production of acetic acid. Other uses such as pyridines and pentaerythritol are expected to grow faster than acetic acid, but the volumes are not large enough to offset the decline in acetic acid. As a consequence, overall acetaldehyde consumption in China may grow slightly at 1.6% per year through 2018. Western Europe is the second-largest consumer of acetaldehyde worldwide, accounting for 20% of world consumption in 2012. As with China, the Western European acetaldehyde market is expected to increase only very slightly at 1% per year during 2012–2018. However, Japan could emerge as a potential consumer for acetaldehyde in next five years due to newfound use in commercial production of butadiene. The supply of butadiene has been volatile in Japan and the rest of Asia. This should provide the much needed boost to the flat market, as of 2013.

Safety

Exposure limits
The threshold limit value is 25ppm (STEL/ceiling value) and the MAK (Maximum Workplace Concentration) is 50 ppm. At 50 ppm acetaldehyde, no irritation or local tissue damage in the nasal mucosa is observed. When taken up by the organism, acetaldehyde is metabolized rapidly in the liver to acetic acid. Only a small proportion is exhaled unchanged. After intravenous injection, the half-life in the blood is approximately 90 seconds.

Dangers

Toxicity
Many serious cases of acute intoxication have been recorded. Acetaldehyde naturally breaks down in the human body.

Irritation
Acetaldehyde is an irritant of the skin, eyes, mucous membranes, throat, and respiratory tract. This occurs at concentrations as low as 1000 ppm. Symptoms of exposure to this compound include nausea, vomiting, and headache. These symptoms may not happen immediately. The perception threshold for acetaldehyde in air is in the range between 0.07 and 0.25 ppm. At such concentrations, the fruity odor of acetaldehyde is apparent. Conjunctival irritations have been observed after a 15-minute exposure to concentrations of 25 and 50 ppm, but transient conjunctivitis and irritation of the respiratory tract have been reported after exposure to 200 ppm acetaldehyde for 15 minutes.

Carcinogenicity
Acetaldehyde is carcinogenic in humans. In 1988 the International Agency for Research on Cancer stated, "There is sufficient evidence for the carcinogenicity of acetaldehyde (the major metabolite of ethanol) in experimental animals." In October 2009 the International Agency for Research on Cancer updated the classification of acetaldehyde stating that acetaldehyde included in and generated endogenously from alcoholic beverages is a Group I human carcinogen. In addition, acetaldehyde is damaging to DNA and causes abnormal muscle development as it binds to proteins.

DNA crosslinks
Acetaldehyde induces DNA interstrand crosslinks, a form of DNA damage. These can be repaired by either of two replication-coupled DNA repair pathways.  The first is referred to as the FA pathway, because it employs gene products defective in Fanconi's anemia patients.  This repair pathway results in increased mutation frequency and altered mutational spectrum.  The second repair pathway requires replication fork convergence, breakage of the acetaldehyde crosslink, translesion synthesis by a Y-family DNA polymerase and homologous recombination.

Aggravating factors

Alzheimer's disease
People with a genetic deficiency for the enzyme responsible for the conversion of acetaldehyde into acetic acid may have a greater risk of Alzheimer's disease. "These results indicate that the ALDH2 deficiency is a risk factor for LOAD [late-onset Alzheimer's disease] ..."

Genetic conditions
A study of 818 heavy drinkers found that those exposed to more acetaldehyde than normal through a genetic variant of the gene encoding for alcohol dehydrogenase are at greater risk of developing cancers of the upper gastrointestinal tract and liver.

Disulfiram
The drug disulfiram (Antabuse) inhibits acetaldehyde dehydrogenase, an enzyme that oxidizes the compound into acetic acid. Metabolism of ethanol forms acetaldehyde before acetaldehyde dehydrogenase forms acetic acid, but with the enzyme inhibited, acetaldehyde accumulates. If one consumes ethanol while taking disulfiram, the hangover effect of ethanol is felt more rapidly and intensely. As such, disulfiram is sometimes used as a deterrent for alcoholics wishing to stay sober.

Sources of exposure

Indoor air
Acetaldehyde is a potential contaminant in workplace, indoors, and ambient environments. Moreover, the majority of humans spend more than 90% of their time in indoor environments, increasing any exposure and the risk to human health.

In a study in France, the mean indoor concentration of acetaldehydes measured in 16 homes was approximately seven times higher than the outside acetaldehyde concentration. The living room had a mean of 18.1±17.5 μg m−3 and the bedroom was 18.2±16.9 μg m−3, whereas the outdoor air had a mean concentration of 2.3±2.6 μg m−3.

It has been concluded that volatile organic compounds (VOC) such as benzene, formaldehyde, acetaldehyde, toluene, and xylenes have to be considered priority pollutants with respect to their health effects. It has been pointed that in renovated or completely new buildings, the VOCs concentration levels are often several orders of magnitude higher. The main sources of acetaldehydes in homes include building materials, laminate, PVC flooring, varnished wood flooring, and varnished cork/pine flooring (found in the varnish, not the wood). It is also found in plastics, oil-based and water-based paints, in composite wood ceilings, particle-board, plywood, treated pine wood, and laminated chipboard furniture.

Outdoor air
The use of acetaldehyde is widespread in different industries, and it may be released into waste water or the air during production, use, transportation and storage. Sources of acetaldehyde include fuel combustion emissions from stationary internal combustion engines and power plants that burn fossil fuels, wood, or trash, oil and gas extraction, refineries, cement kilns, lumber and wood mills and paper mills. Acetaldehyde is also present in automobile and diesel exhaust. As a result, acetaldehyde is "one of the most frequently found air toxics with cancer risk greater than one in a million".

Tobacco smoke
Natural tobacco polysaccharides, including cellulose, have been shown to be the primary precursors making acetaldehyde a significant constituent of tobacco smoke. It has been demonstrated to have a synergistic effect with nicotine in rodent studies of addiction. Acetaldehyde is also the most abundant carcinogen in tobacco smoke; it is dissolved into the saliva while smoking.

Cannabis smoke
Acetaldehyde has been found in cannabis smoke. This finding emerged through the use of new chemical techniques that demonstrated the acetaldehyde present was causing DNA damage in laboratory settings.

Alcohol consumption
Many microbes produce acetaldehyde from ethanol, but they have a lower capacity to eliminate the acetaldehyde, which can lead to the accumulation of acetaldehyde in saliva, stomach acid, and intestinal contents. Fermented food and many alcoholic beverages can also contain significant amounts of acetaldehyde. Acetaldehyde, derived from mucosal or microbial oxidation of ethanol, tobacco smoke, and diet, appears to act as a cumulative carcinogen in the upper digestive tract of humans. According to European Commission's Scientific Committee on Consumer Safety's (SCCS) "Opinion on Acetaldehyde" (2012) the cosmetic products special risk limit is 5 mg/L and acetaldehyde should not be used in mouth-washing products.

Plastics
Acetaldehyde can be produced by the photo-oxidation of polyethylene terephthalate (PET), via a Type II Norrish reaction. 

Although the levels produced by this process are minute acetaldehyde has an exceedingly low taste/odor threshold of around 20–40 ppb and can cause an off-taste in bottled water. The level at which an average consumer could detect acetaldehyde is still considerably lower than any toxicity.

Candida Overgrowth
Candida albicans in patients with potentially carcinogenic oral diseases has been shown to produce acetaldehyde in quantities sufficient to cause problems.

See also
 Alcohol dehydrogenase
 Disulfiram-like drug
 Formaldehyde
 Paraldehyde
 Wine fault

References

External links

 International Chemical Safety Card 0009
 NIOSH Pocket Guide to Chemical Hazards
 Methods for sampling and analysis
 IARC Monograph: "Acetaldehyde"
 Hal Kibbey, Genetic Influences on Alcohol Drinking and Alcoholism, Indiana University Research and Creative Activity, Vol. 17 no. 3.
 United States Food and Drug Administration (FDA) information for acetaldehyde
 Acetaldehyde production process flow sheet by ethylene oxidation method

Aldehydes
Flavors
Hazardous air pollutants
Hepatotoxins
IARC Group 2B carcinogens
Organic compounds with 2 carbon atoms